Albert Leeson (1904-1946) was an English bow maker.

Albert Leeson worked for the firm W.E. Hill & Sons, starting as an apprentice in 1920 and quickly learning to making the finest fleur-de-lys bows (mounted in silver, gold, or tortoiseshell).
He was one of William C Retford's favorite pupils, he was quickly put to work on the finest bows and was eventually allowed to work totally unsupervised which was rare. Albert was also a  keen violinist.

He was accidentally killed by a London bus in 1946. His bows are marked with number 3 on the tip under the bow hair.

References

 Leeson Bow
Bows and Bowmakers - W.C. Retford  1964
W.E. Hill & Sons (A Tribute)- Richard Sadler 1996 
 
 Dictionnaire Universel del Luthiers - Rene Vannes 1951,1972, 1985 (vol.3)
 Universal Dictionary of Violin & Bow Makers - William Henley 1970

Bow makers
British luthiers
1904 births
1946 deaths